Ryan Cavanagh (born 22 November 1995) is an Australian cyclist, who currently rides for UCI Continental team .

Major results

2013
 1st Road race, Oceania Junior Road Championships
2014
 1st  Overall Tour of Poyang Lake
2016
 1st  Overall Battle on the Border
2017
 1st Team time trial, Queensland State Road Championships
 1st  Overall Amy's Otway Tour
1st Stage 1
 1st Launceston International Classic
 1st Stage 3 Tour of Tasmania
2018
 1st Charles Coin Memorial
 1st Stage 5 Tour de Singkarak
 1st Stage 1 Battle Refill
 4th Overall Tour de Siak
 10th Overall Tour de Kumano
2019
 1st  Overall Tour of Thailand
1st Stage 3
 1st  Overall Tour of Quanzhou Bay
1st  Points classification
2020
 2nd Overall Tour de Taiwan
1st Stage 2
2022
 Tour de Kumano
 1st Stage 3
 1st Points classification
 7th Overall Tour of Japan
 8th Oita Urban Classic

References

External links

1995 births
Living people
Australian male cyclists